NGC 997 is an interacting galaxy in the constellation of Cetus. The galaxy was discovered by Albert Marth on 10 November 1863.

See also
List of NGC objects
List of NGC objects (1-1000)

References

External links
 

Elliptical galaxies
Interacting galaxies
0997
Cetus (constellation)
009932